Stafford is a town in the Borough of Stafford, Staffordshire, England.  The unparished area contains 141 buildings that are recorded in the National Heritage List for England as designated listed buildings. Of these, one is listed at Grade I, the highest grade, 15 are listed at Grade II*, the middle of the three grades, and the others are at Grade II, the lowest grade.  This list contains the listed buildings in the central area of the town; those in the town but outside this area are in Listed buildings in Stafford (Outer Area).

Most of the listed buildings in this area are houses and associated structures, shops and offices, hotels and public houses, and churches with items in the churchyards.  The earliest buildings, other than the churches, are timber framed, or have timber framed cores.  The other listed buildings include the foundations of an ancient chapel, a surviving portion of the medieval town walls, commercial buildings, civic buildings, schools and colleges, a shelter, a former cinema, war memorials, and telephone kiosks.


Key

Buildings

References

Citations

Sources

Lists of listed buildings in Staffordshire